Sehore railway station is a main railway station in Sehore district, Madhya Pradesh. Its code is SEH. It serves Sehore city. The station consists of two platforms.

References

Railway stations in Sehore district
Ratlam railway division